Smitilbin is a flavanonol, a type of flavonoid. It is a rhamnoside that can be isolated in Smilax glabra (Chinaroot, sarsaparilla).

Uses 
Smitilbin could be used for preventing immunological hepatocyte damage.

Related compounds 

Neosmitilbin is a stereoisomer of smitilbin.

References 

Flavanonol glycosides
Flavonoid rhamnosides